Ezekiel Bacon (September 1, 1776 – October 18, 1870) was an American lawyer and politician from Massachusetts and New York.

Early life
Ezekiel Bacon was born on September 1, 1776, in Boston, Massachusetts to Elizabeth (née Goldthwaite) and John Bacon. He graduated from Yale College in 1794. Then he attended Litchfield Law School and studied law with Nathan Dane in Beverly, Massachusetts. He was admitted to the bar in 1800.

Career
Bacon commenced practice in Stockbridge, Massachusetts. He was a member of the Massachusetts House of Representatives from 1805 to 1806.

Bacon was elected as a Democratic-Republican to the 10th United States Congress to fill the vacancy caused by the resignation of Barnabas Bidwell and took his seat on November 2, 1807. He was re-elected to the 11th and 12th United States Congresses, holding office until March 3, 1813. He was the chairman of the Committee on Ways and Means (12th Congress).

He was chief justice of the Court of Common Pleas for the Western District of Massachusetts from 1811 to 1814, and Comptroller of the U.S. Treasury from 1814 to 1815.

In 1816, he moved to Utica, New York, and was appointed an associate judge of the Oneida County Court in 1818. He was a member of the New York State Assembly in 1819, and a delegate to the New York State Constitutional Convention of 1821. In 1826, he ran again for Congress but was defeated by the incumbent Henry R. Storrs.

At the time of his death, he was the oldest surviving Member of Congress and the last representative of the administration of President James Madison.

Personal life
Bacon died on October 18, 1870, in Utica. He was buried at the Forest Hill Cemetery in Utica.

Judge and congressman William J. Bacon was his son.

Notes

References
Barlow, William, and David O. Powell. “Congressman Ezekiel Bacon of Massachusetts and the Coming of the War of 1812.” Historical Journal of Western Massachusetts 6 (Spring 1978): 28-41.

External links

1776 births
1870 deaths
Members of the Massachusetts House of Representatives
Members of the New York State Assembly
Yale College alumni
Litchfield Law School alumni
Lawyers from Boston
New York (state) Democratic-Republicans
Politicians from Utica, New York
New York (state) state court judges
Democratic-Republican Party members of the United States House of Representatives from Massachusetts
19th-century American lawyers
Burials at Forest Hill Cemetery (Utica, New York)